The Supplement is a 2002 Polish drama film directed by Krzysztof Zanussi. It was entered into the 24th Moscow International Film Festival where it won the FIPRESCI Special Mention.

Cast
 Pawel Okraska as Filip
 Monika Krzywkowska as Hanka
 Michal Sieczkowski as Patient
 Szymon Bobrowski as Karol
 Karol Urbanski as Andrzej
 Pawel Audykowski as Karol's assistant
 Tadeusz Bradecki as Priest Marek
 Agata Buzek as Fashion Model
 Jerzy Nasierowski as assistant

References

External links
 

2002 films
2002 drama films
Polish drama films
2000s Polish-language films
Films directed by Krzysztof Zanussi
Films scored by Wojciech Kilar